This is a list of seasons completed by the UConn Huskies women's ice hockey team, representing the University of Connecticut.  The list documents the season-by-season records of the Huskies from 2000 to present, including postseason records, and league awards for individual players or head coaches.

UConn has yet to claim a conference championship since establishing the program in 2000.  The Huskies began Division I play in as an independent for one season, before joining ECAC Hockey for one season.  UConn became a charter member of Hockey East in 2002.

References

 
UConn
UConn Huskies ice hockey seasons